László Farkas may refer to:

 László Farkas (biathlete) (born 1960), Hungarian Olympics biathlete
 László Farkas (sailor) (born 1941), Hungarian Olympic sailor